The National Engineering School of Carthage or ENICarthage, is a Tunisian engineering school based in the city of Ariana located in the north of the country. Part of the Carthage University.

Establishment 
The National Engineering School of Carthage was founded in 2002.

See also
 National Engineering School of Tunis
 National Engineering School of Monastir
 National Engineering School of Bizerte
 National Engineering School of Sousse
 National Engineering School of Gabès
 National Engineering School of Sfax
 National Engineering School of Gafsa
 Carthage University

References

External links 
 Official website

2002 establishments in Tunisia
universities in Tunisia